Flugplatz may refer to:
Flugplatz (corner) of the Nürburgring raceway
Aerodrome